Resprouters are plant species that are able to survive fire by the activation of dormant vegetative buds to produce regrowth.

Plants may resprout from a bud bank that can be located in different places, including in the trunk or major branches (epicormic shoots) or in belowground structures like lignotubers, bulbs, and other structures.

Resprouters characterize chaparral, fynbos, kwongan, savanna and other landscapes that experience periodic fires.

See also
Adventitiousness
Coppicing
Crown sprouting
Cutting (plant)
Geoxyle
Water sprout

References

Wildfire ecology
Plant morphology
Plant physiology